Mohit Bhandari is an Indian bariatric surgeon known for his work in laparoscopic and robot-assisted surgery. He is the first surgeon in Asian sub-continent to perform more than twenty one thousand bariatrics and metabolic surgeries. He is pro-chancellor of Sri Aurobindo Institute of Medical Sciences, Indore, Director of bariatric surgery at Mohak Bariatrics and Robotics, a surgery center he founded, and Director at Enliten. He also operates at MPCT Hospital in Sanpada. US based Allurion Technologies launched weight loss solution, a first of its kind in India in partnership with his hospital Mohak Bariatrics.

Career

He was one of the first surgeons to perform robotic bariatric surgery in India and also the first Indian doctor to perform single anastomosis duodenal-ileal switch.
 
Bhandari entered the Limca Book of Records in 2015 by performing 25 bariatric surgeries in an 11-hour period, performing the feat with the help of a 40-person team. The previous record was held by Atul Peters who performed 16 surgeries in a 12-hour period. Dr. Mohit Bhandari successfully operated a Mauritian "Dharamveer" weighing 410 kg at Mohak Bariatrics and Robotics, Indore.

In view of the higher risk of Corona among obese people, the National Board of Examinations of India decided to start a course in obesity surgery and in July 2021, he was appointed as a specialist member by the Board. He responsibility is to decide the criteria of the institution for starting the course, prepare the syllabus and decide the pattern of examinations.

His name is recorded in Limca Book of Records for conducting twenty five surgeries in eleven hours and in World Book of Records for performing sixty five bariatric surgeries in twelve hours.
 
In September 2022, US based Allurion Technologies launched innovative weight loss solution approved by Central Drug Standard Control Organisation (CDSCO) in India in partnership with Dr. Bhandari. He also spearheaded the trial in India prior to CDSCO approval.

Personal life
He is married to his college friend Shilpa Bhagdikar, a gynaecologist and an In vitro fertilisation (IVF) expert.

References

External links
 Mohak Bariatrics & Robotics, surgery center of Dr. Bhandari
 Mohit Bhandari on Twitter

Living people
Indian surgeons
World record holders
20th-century Indian medical doctors
People from Indore
20th-century surgeons
1980 births